Haal may refer to:

Renee Haal
Hal (Sufism)

See also
Hääl